Emmanuel Esparza (born 2 March 1976) is a Spanish actor based in Colombia, where he became popular for his performances in La Pola (2010–2011) and Mentiras perfectas (2013–2014). He has also starred in Fugitivos (2014) and Venganza (2017). Later that same year, it was highlighted internationally in the Telemundo's crime drama series El Señor de los Cielos, where he played Tony Pastrana, the main antagonist throughout Season 5.

Personal life 
He maintained a relationship with actress and model Cristina Warner. In 2015 his first daughter Zoe was born.

Filmography

References

External links 
 

1976 births
Spanish male television actors
21st-century Spanish male actors
21st-century Colombian male actors
Living people